Berthold, Bertholde or Bertholdus of Toul (died 25 September 1018, Toul) was a German Roman Catholic clergyman.

Life
He was the thirty-sixth bishop of Toul, succeeding Robert. The clergy of Toul confirmed his nomination by Otto III, Holy Roman Emperor due to his piety. He was consecrated on 3 October 995 by Ludolf of Trier, who proposed that he model his life on his predecessor Gerard of Toul. He held the post until his death.

At Toul, Berthold had a school for the sons of the nobility. Five-year-old Bruno of Egisheim-Dagsburg, son of Emperor Conrad II's first cousin, Count Hugo, was entrusted to Bishop Berthold to be educated. Bruno later became Pope Leo IX.

References

Sources
Dom Augustin Calmet, Histoire ecclésiastique et civile de la Lorraine, Nancy, 1728, 4 vol., in-fol.
A.D. Thiéry, Histoire de la ville de Toul et de ses évêques, suivie d'une notice de la cathédrale

Date of birth unknown
1018 deaths
Bishops of Toul